"Territorial gold" refers to the gold token coins that began to be produced in U.S. territories at the time of the California Gold Rush. California gold coins were issued from 1849 to 1883; Mormon gold coinage in Utah Territory from 1848 to 1860; "beaver coins" in Oregon Territory in 1849; and gold coins in Colorado Territory from 1860 to 1861.

References

Historical currencies of the United States
United States gold coins
19th century in the United States